Simon Eliot is professor of the History of the Book at the Institute of English Studies, School of Advanced Study, at the University of London. He is the general editor of the History of Oxford University Press and the editor of Publishing History. He is the joint editor of Wiley-Blackwell's A Companion to the History of the Book (2007).

References

External links 
https://www.sas.ac.uk/about-us/news/professor-simon-eliot-talks-about-ministry-information

Living people
Year of birth missing (living people)
Academics of the University of London